Tina Bosworth is an American log-roller, and holds the world record for winning the most women's log rolling championships.

Career 
Bosworth is recognized by Guinness World Records for being the only ten-time women's log-rolling world champion. She is the only person who has ever won five consecutive gold medals in the ESPN Great Outdoor Games.

Bosworth won the Best Outdoor Sportsman ESPY Award in 2004, and is the only woman to ever do so.

Personal life 
Bosworth is the sister of J. R. Salzman, a veteran and another top log-roller.

References 

American loggersports competitors
Living people
Year of birth missing (living people)